Mohammed Yahya Majrashi (born 20 May 1991) is a Saudi Arabian professional footballer who plays as a striker for Al-Fayha. He played at the 2011 FIFA U-20 World Cup and 2013 AFC U-22 Asian Cup qualification.

International goals

References

External links 
 Sofifa profile
 

1991 births
Living people
Saudi Arabian footballers
Association football forwards
Al-Ahli Saudi FC players
Najran SC players
Al-Taawoun FC players
Al-Faisaly FC players
Ohod Club players
Al-Fateh SC players
Al-Fayha FC players
Sportspeople from Jeddah
Saudi Professional League players
Saudi Arabia youth international footballers